Akuku is an Edoid language of Nigeria.

References

Edoid languages